Claude François Alexandre Houtteville (1686, Paris – 9 November 1742, Paris) was a French churchman and religious writer.

1686 births
1742 deaths
Writers from Paris
French Oratory
Roman Catholic writers
French male writers